This is a list of the first women lawyer(s) and judge(s) in Delaware. It includes the year in which the women were admitted to practice law (in parentheses). Also included are women who achieved other distinctions such becoming the first in their state to graduate from law school or become a political figure.

Firsts in Delaware's history

Law School 

 First female to complete law school without first attending college: Helen Balick (1969) in 1966

Lawyers 

 First females: Evangilyn Barsky and Sybil Ward (1923) 
First African American female: Paulette Sullivan Moore (1977)  
 First Latino American female (Puerto Rican descent): Nivea Castro (1980)

State judges 

 First female: Roxana Cannon Arsht (1941) in 1971 
 First female (Court of Chancery): Carolyn Berger (1976) in 1984  
 First female (Delaware Superior Court): Susan C. Del Pesco in 1988 
 First African American female: Haile L. Alford in 1992  
 First female (Delaware Supreme Court): Carolyn Berger (1976) in 1994 
 First female (Chief Judge; Delaware Family Court): Chandlee Johnson Kuhn in 2003  
 First Hispanic American (female) (justice of the peace court): Michelle Jewell in 2010
 First (openly lesbian) female (President of the Delaware Superior Court): Jan R. Jurden in 2012  
 First Hispanic American (female) (Delaware Superior Court): Vivian L. Medinilla (née Rapposelli) in 2013  
 First female (common pleas court): Rosemary Betts Beauregard 
 First female magistrate (Chief Magistrate; Justice of the Peace Court): Patricia W. Griffin: 
 First African American (female) (Supreme Court of Delaware): Tamika Montgomery-Reeves in 2020

Federal judges 
 First female (United States Bankruptcy Court): Helen Balick (1969) in 1974  
 First female (United States District Court for the District of Delaware): Jane Richards Roth in 1985  
 First female (United States Court of Appeals for the Third Circuit): Jane Richards Roth in 1991 
 First female (Chief Judge; United States Court of Appeals for the Third Circuit): Sue Lewis Robinson in 2000

Assistant United States Attorney 

 First female: Peggy L. Ableman from 1979-1983

Attorney General of Delaware 

 First female: M. Jane Brady (1977) from 1995-2005

Deputy Attorney General 

 First female: Ruth Farrell in 1962

Political Office 

 First female (House of Representatives): Melanie George Smith in 2002

Delaware State Bar Association 

 First female president: Susan C. Del Pesco

Firsts in local history
 Frances M. "Mickey" Messina: First female to serve as a Commissioner for the Kent County Levy Court (1972)
 Cathleen Hutchison:  First female to serve as Deputy Chief Magistrate for the Justice of the Peace Court in Kent County, Delaware (2017)
 Marguerite Hopkins Bodziak (1931): First female to serve as an Assistant City Solicitor in Wilmington, Delaware (1933) [New Castle County, Delaware]
Sara Pennington: First female magistrate in New Castle County, Delaware (1953)
Phila Furry George: First female lawyer for the Hercules Powder Company in Wilmington, Delaware (1943) [New Castle County, Delaware]
Haile L. Alford: First African American female to serve on the Superior Court of New Castle County (1992)
Lisa Roberson Hatfield: First female to serve as the Alderman's Court for Newark (2007)
Jan R. Jurden: First female to become President of the New Castle County Superior Court, Delaware (2012)
Battle Robinson (1971): First female lawyer in Sussex County, Delaware
Rosemary Betts Beauregard: First female judge in Sussex County, Delaware
Michelle Jewell: First Hispanic American magistrate in Sussex County, Delaware

See also  
 List of first women lawyers and judges in the United States
 Timeline of women lawyers in the United States
 Women in law

Other topics of interest 

 List of first minority male lawyers and judges in the United States
 List of first minority male lawyers and judges in Delaware

References 

Lawyers, Delaware, first
Delaware, first
Women, Delaware, first
Women, Delaware, first
Women in Delaware
Lists of people from Delaware
Delaware lawyers